The Internet Access and Training Program (IATP) funded by USAID since 2007, is a program of the Bureau of Educational and Cultural Affairs (ECA), US Department of State, funded in the past under the Freedom Support Act (FSA). IATP was administered by Project Harmony in Russia and still is administered by the International Research & Exchanges Board (IREX) in other Eurasian countries.  IATP promotes Internet training and provides Internet access in developing countries around the world.

Overview
IATP consists of a network of Internet access sites located throughout 11 countries of Eurasia. Through these sites, thousands of individuals per month receive free-of-charge access to the Internet as well as to a wide variety of computer-related training programs. IATP access sites are located in the countries of Armenia, Azerbaijan, Belarus, Georgia, Kazakhstan, Kyrgyzstan, Moldova, Tajikistan, Turkmenistan, Ukraine, and Uzbekistan.

IATP began in the mid 1990s. At that time, the program was aimed at providing Internet access and training exclusively to scholars from Eurasia who had participated in US government-sponsored exchange programs. Through its services, IATP helped these exchange program alumni stay in contact with the professional colleagues they had made while in the United States, assisting them in the process of continuing their research and academic growth once back home. Over time, IATP gradually began to provide Internet access and training to other non-alumni groups such as journalists, lawyers, NGO representatives, and students. Providing the services of the program to new audiences has continued to this day. Today, IATP provides its services to the public at large in the countries in which it works.

Almost all IATP access sites are housed within local partner institutions. These institutions typically include public libraries, universities, and NGOs. An IATP access site usually occupies one room in the partner institution’s premises. This room houses all IATP equipment, computer-related books and manuals, and an IREX staff member who oversees the operations of the access site. In a limited number of cases, IATP sites are part of the larger IREX office in a given country.

IATP began operating in Moldova in 1998. At present, there is one core IATP access site and there are seven independent Internet centers. In July 2006, 333 residents of Moldova visited the IATP training laboratory, and 63 people attended training courses. IATP's server in Moldova hosts 244 non-commercial websites.

IATP undertakes four primary activities—provided free of charge—through its network of sites:
Internet Access. Users can reserve time in increments of one hour to access e-mail and the Internet, or use the computers for other purposes such as word processing.

Training 
Members of the public can enroll in a wide variety of training courses on information technology. These include basic courses in computer literacy to higher-end training on subjects such as Web programming and network administration.

Online Chats 
Chats have evolved into a valuable medium for exchanging unrestricted information about events across borders, offering an alternative perspective to other types of media. Governmental officials from many countries have been the guests of honor in IATP-hosted Web chats, including numerous members of parliament and US Embassy officials. For example, nationwide chats held in Ukraine in December 2005 gave librarians the opportunity to lobby the Ministry of Culture for simplification of the regulations regarding procurement. This lobbying effort was successful, and is being studied among librarians in other countries across Eurasia through additional online chats.

A series of chats hosted by the IATP network in Eurasia in November 2005 with representatives of Ministries of Education, US Embassy officials, and ECA alumni gave opportunities for citizens to discuss problems and solutions in the educational system, learn about available scholarships for high school, undergraduate, and graduate studies as well as short-term professional qualification courses in the United States and European countries, and obtain first-hand information about the advantages of studying abroad directly from alumni. This example shows that the network of IATP access sites throughout Eurasia supports implementing new educational practices and helping establish cooperation between educators from different countries of the region.

Web Hosting 
IATP collaborates with users to create websites and other electronic media. The focus is on creating resources in local languages, making Internet usage more relevant and useful within each of the countries. 

IREX works to run IATP less like a foreign technical assistance program and more like a community-based technology initiative. One way to do this is by attempting to create a sense of community at IATP sites that encourages users to share their knowledge and time for the benefit of others and the program as a whole. For example, users volunteer at IATP sites to assist with tasks such as routine computer maintenance and translation of materials for publication on the Web. In other cases, users donate their time to conduct Internet training that ties Internet usage with a specific theme such as journalism, environmental conservation, organizational networking, or language teaching. The institutions that house IATP access sites also contribute to community buy-in and support by providing a substantial amount of cost-share. Cost-share most often takes the form of a partner institution providing IATP with free rent, utilities, and security.

References
 IATP Official WebSite
 IATP Belarus

United States Department of State
Bureau of Educational and Cultural Affairs